Olimarao Atoll is an uninhabited atoll with a land area of 0.2 km2 in the State of Yap in the Federated States of Micronesia. It is located 36 kilometers northwest of Elato and 860 kilometers southeast of Yap island. Olimarao belongs administratively to Elato.

Geography
The atoll's surface is 11 km2 and it is roughly 5 km long and 3 km wide. The lagoon has a surface of about 6 km2 and two passages into it located in the southern fringes of the reef.

Islands
There are only two small islets (Motus) on the reef, with a total surface of 0.2 km2 (20 hectares): 
Olimarao Island, located at the NE end of the reef is the largest
Falipi Island in the SW corner is only 2.4 ha in surface

Both islands have coconut palms, among other vegetation, like Scaevola taccada bushes.

Ecology
The whole atoll is part of the Olimarao Conservation Area. This zone is meant to protect the breeding places of sea turtles, coconut crabs and pelagic birds.

See also

 Desert island
 List of islands

References

External links
Marine World Database
Report of the German South Pacific Expedition 1908-1910
Polynesia-Micronesia Biodiversity Hotspot

Atolls of the Federated States of Micronesia
Islands of Yap
Uninhabited islands of the Federated States of Micronesia